Richard Challoner School is an all boys secondary school with a mixed sixth form that is federated with Holy Cross School, New Malden. It has an academy status and is located in Kingston upon Thames, south-west London, England. The school is named after Bishop Richard Challoner.

Headmasters 
The Headmasters of the school since its founding in 1959 are:

Arts

The Richard Challoner Studio Theatre was officially opened by the Hungarian Ambassador in 2008. Various productions were first performed there, including Oliver, The Government Inspector, Antigone, Robin Hood, Sherlock Holmes: And the Pearls of Death, Chaplin: The Early Years and Romeo and Juliet, and then performed, on tour, in various theatres in Hungary, such as the Kolibri Theatre in Budapest. Many of the plays are written by drama teacher Mr. Neil Zoladkiewicz, who retired at the end of the 2016–17 school year.

The school also performs musicals. The most recent was A Slice Of Saturday Night in 2017, with the previous performance of Grease Lightning having happened in partnership with Willson Academy of Performing Arts in 2016.

Notable former pupils 

Jérémie Boga - professional footballer who plays for Chelsea
Jimmy Glass - former professional goalkeeper known for last minute winner for Carlisle United in 1999 that kept them in the Football League
Ben Hawkey - actor who starred in the HBO series Game of Thrones amongst other titles
Tom Holland - actor who starred as Spider-Man in the Marvel cinematic universe
Charly Musonda - professional footballer who plays for Chelsea
Steven Reid - former professional and international footballer who last played for Burnley F.C.
Archie Renaux - actor who starred in Netflix Shadow and Bone and model
Ryan Sweeney (footballer) - Professional footballer who currently plays for Dundee FC

References

External links
Official School Website

Boys' schools in London
Academies in the Royal Borough of Kingston upon Thames
Catholic secondary schools in the Archdiocese of Southwark
Secondary schools in the Royal Borough of Kingston upon Thames